Muchacha italiana viene a casarse (English: Italian Bride) is a Mexican telenovela produced and directed by Pedro Damián for Televisa. It is a remake of the 1971 Mexican telenovela Muchacha italiana viene a casarse.

Livia Brito and José Ron star as the protagonists, while Nailea Norvind and Mike Biaggio star as antagonists of the telenovela.

On October 20, 2014, Canal de las Estrellas began airing "Muchacha Italiana viene a casarse" weekdays at 4:15 p.m.,replacing La Gata.  The series finale aired in Mexico on June 21, 2015. Two alternative endings for the telenovela were available for streaming on the telenovela's official site following its finale.  It started airing weeknights on August 25, 2015 on  Univision.

Plot 
Hoping to get medical care for her sister, Gianna, who suffers from a heart condition, Fiorella Bianchi, a recently orphaned Italian woman, moves to Mexico and accepts a marriage proposal from her late father's deceptive, but wealthy friend. After her fiance abandons the sisters, Fiorella works as a maid for the prominent Ángeles family, where she falls in love with Pedro Ángeles, a man whose family legacy is based on mysterious circumstances.

Background and production
Pedro Damián announced his intention to produce a remake of Muchacha italiana viene a casarse in the spring of 2014. Casting for the telenovela was conducted from May through July in Mexico City. In July and early August, Eleazar Gomez, José Pablo Minor, Jessica Coch, and newcomer Ela Velden were among some of the first actors to be confirmed for the telenovela. Irán Castillo was previously attached to the project, but later dropped out, citing health-related concerns. Livia Brito and José Ron were officially confirmed as the protagonists on August 18, 2014.

Filming
Production officially began on August 25, 2014. Brito, Ron, and Velden filmed scenes and promotional spots in Maratea, Italy for two weeks. The cast began filming in Mexico City in early September.
 Livia Brito and Ela Velden studied Italian in order to more accurately portray their roles.

Production in Mexico City ended in late April 2015. In early May 2015, Brito, Ron, Velden, Isela Vega, Maribel Guardia, Fernando Allende, and José Pablo Minor traveled to Maratea, Naples, and other Italian locations, including a beach in Cersuta, where they spent time filming the telenovela's finale. Production was officially completed on May 12, 2015 in Italy. The cast returned to Mexico City in late May.

Promotion
On October 6, 2014, the cast participated in a Tibetan Buddhist prayer ceremony, which was also attended by the Italian ambassador to Mexico, Alessandro Busacca. On October 15, 2014, the cast, crew, and a promotional trailer, featuring exclusive new scenes, were presented to media in a special event at Televisa San Ángel; it was streamed live for fans on the telenovela's official website.

Cast

Main

Supporting

Mexico broadcast

Awards and nominations

See also The storyline

References

External links 

2014 telenovelas
Mexican telenovelas
Televisa telenovelas
2014 Mexican television series debuts
Television shows set in Mexico City
Television shows set in Italy
2015 Mexican television series endings
Television series reboots
Spanish-language telenovelas